Simon Vestdijk (17 October 1898 – 23 March 1971) was a Dutch writer.

He was nominated for the Nobel prize in literature fifteen times.

Life
Born in the small Frisian town of Harlingen, Vestdijk studied medicine in Amsterdam, but turned to literature after a few years as a doctor, including some time on board a ship. From 1932 he lived from literature. He became one of the most important 20th-century writers in the Netherlands. During the German occupation, he and other Dutch intellectuals were held hostage for some time, partly because they did not want to join the Chamber of Culture. After the war, he retired to Doorn (Utrecht province). 

Vestdijk struggled with severe depressions from his youth, and until the end of his life.

His prolificness as a novelist was legendary (poet Adriaan Roland Holst saying of him that "he writes quicker than God can read"), but he was at least as important as an essayist on e.g., literature, religion, art, and music in particular. He also wrote much poetry and short stories. His work has been translated into several European languages. Some of his novels appeared as films in the cinema, or were broadcast on television.

Bibliography (books in English) 
 Simon Vestdijk: On the poet Emily Dickinson. Transl. by Peter Twydell. Doorn, Mycenta Vitilis, 2002.  (Orig. publ. in 1933)
 Simon Vestdijk: The future of religion. Transl. by Jacob Faber. Ann Arbor, Michigan, U.M.I., out of print Books on Demand, 1989. (translation of De toekomst der religie, orig. publ. in 1947)
 Simon Vestdijk: Back to Ina Damman radio-play adaptation of the novel by Simon Vestdijk ; adaptation: Marc Lohmann. (Transl. of an adaptation of the novel Terug tot Ina Damman. Hilversum, Nederlandse Omroep Stichting, 1988. No ISBN
 S. Vestdijk: The garden where the brass band played. Translation by A. Brotherton of the novel De koperen tuin, with an introduction by Hella S. Haasse. London, Quartet Books, 1992. . Other editions: New York, New Amsterdam, 1989.  ; Leyden/London/New York, 1965. No ISBN
 Emily Dickinson: Gedichten. Transl. by S. Vestdijk. Den Haag, Bert Bakker, 1969. 
 Emily Dickinson: Selected poems. (Chosen by Simon Vestdijk). Amsterdam, Balkema, 1940 (=1944)
 Simon Vestdijk: Rum Island, Transl. by B.K. Bowes of the novel Rumeiland. London, John Calder, 1963
 Simon Vestdijk : My brown friend &  Miodrag Bulatović : Lovers & Keith Johnstone: The return & Robert Pinget: La manivelle. The old tune (English adapt. by Samuel Beckett). London, Calder, 1962

References

External links
http://www.svestdijk.nl/al/wpengels.html
http://www.vestdijk.com (Dutch)

1898 births
1971 deaths
20th-century Dutch novelists
20th-century male writers
Dutch male poets
Dutch medical writers
Dutch essayists
University of Amsterdam alumni
People from Harlingen, Netherlands
Constantijn Huygens Prize winners
P. C. Hooft Award winners
Prijs der Nederlandse Letteren winners
Translators of Edgar Allan Poe
Dutch male novelists
20th-century essayists